The 2011 Oceania Track Championships were the 2011 edition of the annual Oceania Track Championships and were held at the Adelaide Super-Drome in Adelaide, Australia. The championships were the first opportunity for riders from Oceania to qualify for the 2012 Summer Olympics. All ten Olympic events (sprint, team sprint, keirin, team pursuit and omnium) were included for both men and women. Non-Olympics events (time trial, individual pursuit, points race, scratch race) were also included for both men and women as well as madison for men. Under 19 events were also held for each event; however, the men's madison and women's (keirin, team sprint, team pursuit, points race and omnium were combined Under 19 and Elite events.

Eligible nations

Medal summary

Medal summary U19

Elite medal table

U19 medal table

Overall medal table

Olympic event medal table

Oceania Track Championships
2011 in track cycling